Anita Irarrázabal (born 10 July 1982) is a Chilean alpine skier. She competed in the women's super-G at the 2002 Winter Olympics.

References

External links
 

1982 births
Living people
Chilean female alpine skiers
Olympic alpine skiers of Chile
Alpine skiers at the 2002 Winter Olympics
Sportspeople from Santiago
21st-century Chilean women